Rocco Ascone (born 12 September 2003) is a French footballer who plays as a midfielder for FC Nordsjælland, on loan from Lille.

Career

Ascone started his career with French Ligue 1 side Lille. Before the second half of the 2021–22 season, he was sent on loan to Nordsjælland in Denmark. On 27 February 2022, Ascone debuted for Nordsjælland during a 0–0 draw with Randers.

International career
Born in France, Ascone is of Italian descent. He is a youth international for France, having represented the France U16s in 2019.

References

External links
 
 

2003 births
Living people
People from Villeneuve-d'Ascq
Association football midfielders
French footballers
France youth international footballers
French sportspeople of Italian descent
Danish Superliga players
Lille OSC players
FC Nordsjælland players
French expatriate footballers
Expatriate men's footballers in Denmark
French expatriate sportspeople in Denmark
Sportspeople from Nord (French department)
Footballers from Hauts-de-France